ForThemAsses is the second album by California band OPM, released on June 22, 2004. The album features Johnny Richter, Eek-A-Mouse and Yellowman. It produced one single "Horny" released in 2005. The 2005 release of the album features a front cover similar to the Outlaws, Perverts and Misfits EP as well as featuring 3 bonus tracks; "Down Under", "Conflict" and "Horny" featuring TJ Lavin.

Track listing
 "Intro" – 0:34
 "Bump" - 3:38
 "Rollin" - 3:49
 "Luffly" - 3:15
 "Interlude: Dave Grohl" - 0:11
 "Kali Kings"  (featuring Johnny Richter) - 4:42
 "Every Day" - 4:10
 "Perfect Day" (featuring Eek-A-Mouse) - 4:07
 "Interlude: Doggy Style" - 0:12
 "Horny" - 3:33
 "How It Soundz" - 3:30
 "I Don't O U" - 3:38
 "Necropolis" (featuring Yellowman) - 5:07
 "Interlude: You Have a Collect Call" - 0:24
 "Pot Luck" - 2:32
 "Viva" - 10:00

2005 Bonus Tracks
 "Down Under" - 3:57
 "Conflict" - 4:09
 "Horny" (featuring TJ Lavin) - 3:54

Videos
"Horny"
"Rollin"
"Luffly"

Band Line-up
John E. Necro - lead vocals, rapping, piano
Big B - rapping, vocals
Geoff Turney aka Casper - guitar, bass
Jonathan Williams - organ, keyboards
Michael Beinhorn - percussion
Etienne Franc - bass on "Conflict"
Gary Dean - drums on "Conflict"

Lyrics
The lyrics for every song on the album can be found in PDF form at the official OPM website under Music, or by clicking here (direct link to .pdf file).

References

OPM (band) albums
2004 albums
Suburban Noize Records albums